Gustavo Nicolás Fuentealba Tobar (born 31 October 1994) is a Chilean footballer who plays as a goalkeeper.

Career

Fuentealba started his career with Chilean second division side Lota Schwager, where he suffered relegation to the third division.

For the 2020 season, Fuentealba signed for La Serena in the Chilean top flight from fifth division club Deportes Quillón.

He has played in the Chilean fifth, fourth, third, second divisions as well as the top flight.

References

External links
 
 Gustavo Fuentealba at playmakerstats.com (English version of ceroacero.es)

1994 births
Living people
Footballers from Santiago
Chilean footballers
Lota Schwager footballers
C.D. Arturo Fernández Vial footballers
Independiente de Cauquenes footballers
Deportes Vallenar footballers
Deportes La Serena footballers
Puerto Montt footballers
Primera B de Chile players
Segunda División Profesional de Chile players
Chilean Primera División players
Association football goalkeepers